Stefan Edberg was the defending champion, but lost in the quarterfinals this year.

Ivan Lendl won the title, defeating Henrik Holm in the final, 7–6(9–7), 6–4.

Seeds

Draw

Finals

Top half

Section 1

Section 2

Bottom half

Section 3

Section 4

References

 Main Draw

1992 ATP Tour
Tokyo Indoor